The sand crawler (Sticharium dorsale) is a species of clinid endemic to the coast of southern Australia.

References

dorsale
Fish described in 1867
Taxa named by Albert Günther